In Greek mythology, the name Cleobule or Cleoboule (Ancient Greek: Κλεοβούλη, Kleoboúlē) or Cleobula refers to:

Cleobule, daughter of Aeolus or Aeopolus, one of the possible mothers of Myrtilus by Hermes.
Cleobule, wife of Aleus of Tegea, mother of Cepheus and Amphidamas.
Cleobula, mother by Ares of Cycnus who was killed by Heracles.
Cleobule, mother of Amphimachus by Cteatus instead of Theronice.
Cleobule, mother of Leonteus by Coronus.
Cleobule, daughter of Eurytus and by Tenthredon, possibly the mother of Prothous, leader of the Magnesians during the Trojan War. Otherwise, Eurymache was called the mother of the Prothous.
Cleobule, mother of Phoenix by Amyntor. Otherwise, Hippodameia or Alcimede was called the mother). Cleobule had two other possible children by Amyntor, Asydameia and Crantor.
Cleobule, the Boeotian mother of Leitus by Lacritus; alternately, mother of Arcesilaus by Alector (Alectryon). Otherwise, Leitus' mother was Polybule by Alector or he was an earth-born, thus a son of Gaea. Meanwhile, Arcesilaus' parents were Areilycus and Theobule.
Cleobule, mother of the tragedian Euripides by Apollo, as stated by Hyginus. Whether this is an otherwise unknown legend or simply the result of corruption of the text is uncertain.

Notes

References 

 Apollodorus, The Library with an English Translation by Sir James George Frazer, F.B.A., F.R.S. in 2 Volumes, Cambridge, MA, Harvard University Press; London, William Heinemann Ltd. 1921. . Online version at the Perseus Digital Library. Greek text available from the same website.
Euripides, The Complete Greek Drama, edited by Whitney J. Oates and Eugene O'Neill, Jr. in two volumes. 1. Iphigenia in Tauris, translated by Robert Potter. New York. Random House. 1938. Online version at the Perseus Digital Library.
 Euripides, Euripidis Fabulae. vol. 2. Gilbert Murray. Oxford. Clarendon Press, Oxford. 1913. Greek text available at the Perseus Digital Library.
 Gantz, Timothy, Early Greek Myth: A Guide to Literary and Artistic Sources, Johns Hopkins University Press, 1996, Two volumes:  (Vol. 1),  (Vol. 2).
 Gaius Julius Hyginus, Fabulae from The Myths of Hyginus translated and edited by Mary Grant. University of Kansas Publications in Humanistic Studies. Online version at the Topos Text Project.
Homer, The Iliad with an English Translation by A.T. Murray, Ph.D. in two volumes. Cambridge, MA., Harvard University Press; London, William Heinemann, Ltd. 1924. . Online version at the Perseus Digital Library.
Homer, Homeri Opera in five volumes. Oxford, Oxford University Press. 1920. . Greek text available at the Perseus Digital Library.
 Paton, W. R. (ed.), Greek Anthology, Volume I: Book 1: Christian Epigrams. Book 2: Description of the Statues in the Gymnasium of Zeuxippus. Book 3: Epigrams in the Temple of Apollonis at Cyzicus. Book 4: Prefaces to the Various Anthologies. Book 5: Erotic Epigrams. Translated by W. R. Paton. Revised by Michael A. Tueller. Loeb Classical Library No. 67. Cambridge, Massachusetts: Harvard University Press, 2014. Online version at Harvard University Press.
Tzetzes, John, Allegories of the Iliad translated by Goldwyn, Adam J. and Kokkini, Dimitra. Dumbarton Oaks Medieval Library, Harvard University Press, 2015. 
 Tzetzes, Scolia eis Lycophroon, edited by Christian Gottfried Müller, Sumtibus F.C.G. Vogelii, 1811. Internet Archive
Queens in Greek mythology
Women of Ares
Mortal parents of demigods in classical mythology

Boeotian characters in Greek mythology